Anajaira Maciel Claudio Burgos (born 24 August 1996) is a Dominican former footballer who played as a forward. She has been a member of the Dominican Republic women's national team.

International career
Claudio capped for the Dominican Republic at senior level during the 2012 CONCACAF Women's Olympic Qualifying Tournament.

References 

1996 births
Living people
Women's association football forwards
Dominican Republic women's footballers
Dominican Republic women's international footballers